Mostiškės is a village in Vilnius District Municipality, Lithuania. According to the 2011 census, it had population of 631.

References

Villages in Vilnius County
Vilnius District Municipality